Sir Eric Clare Edmund Phipps  (27 October 1875 – 13 August 1945) was a British diplomat.

Family
Phipps was the son of Sir Constantine Phipps, later British Ambassador to Belgium, and his wife, Maria Jane (née Miller Mundy). Henry Phipps, 1st Earl of Mulgrave, was his great-grandfather, and he was also a great-grandson of Lieutenant-General Sir Colin Campbell, who was present at the Battle of Waterloo, and of Rear-Admiral Sir John Hindmarsh, who was a Lieutenant on HMS Phoebe at the Battle of Trafalgar.

Early life and career
As a child, he accompanied his parents around Europe to his father's various postings. He was educated at King's College, Cambridge, and the University of Paris, from which he graduated.

He passed the competitive examination for entry to the Diplomatic Service in January 1899 and was posted as an attaché to Paris in October 1899, being promoted Third Secretary in January 1901.

In January 1905 he was posted to Constantinople, was promoted Second Secretary in April and returned to London to work at the Foreign Office in September. In September 1906, he was posted to Rome and in February 1909, he returned to Paris as private secretary to Sir Francis Bertie, British Ambassador to France. In April 1912, he was promoted First Secretary and posted to St Petersburg, transferred to Madrid in October 1913. He returned to Paris in May 1916.

He was on the staff of the British delegation to the Versailles Conference until September 1919, when he was promoted to counsellor and posted back to London. In November 1920, he was posted to Brussels as chargé d'affaires, and in November 1922, he was promoted to minister plenipotentiary and posted back to Paris, often serving as chargé d'affaires in the absence of the ambassador.

In June 1928, Phipps received his first independent posting as Envoy Extraordinary and Minister Plenipotentiary to Austria.

Ambassador to Germany
In 1933, he was appointed British Ambassador to Germany. To some extent, he followed policies later known as appeasement, as he believed that the League of Nations was the key to preventing the next war. He tried to enlist the French in efforts to get the Germans to co-operate.

However, in some despatches, he warned the British government about the character of the régime. On 31 January 1934, he told his Foreign Secretary:

[Hitler's] policy is simple and straightforward. If his neighbours allow him, he will become strong by the simplest and most direct methods. The mere fact that he is making himself unpopular abroad will not deter him, for, as he said in a recent speech, it is better to be respected and feared than to be weak and liked. If he finds that he arouses no real opposition, the tempo of his advance will increase. On the other hand, if he is vigorously opposed, he is unlikely at this stage to risk a break.

Phipps gave a further warning on 1 April 1935 of Germany's growing military strength:

Let us hope our pacifists at home may at length realise that the rapidly-growing monster of German militarism will not be placated by mere cooings, but will only be restrained from recourse to its ultima ratio by the knowledge that the Powers who desire peace are also strong enough to enforce it.

During his first year in Berlin, Phipps managed to see Hitler only four times. Phipps himself regarded Hitler as something of a cipher or enigma; Hitler was variously described in his dispatches back to London as more moderate than his followers or as possibly mad. In May 1936, Phipps presented to Hitler the famous "questionnaire", largely written by his brother-in-law, the Under-Secretary of State for Foreign Affairs, Sir Robert Vansittart, that asked point-blank if Germany intended "to respect the existing territorial and political status of Europe" and was willing to sign "genuine treaties". Neither Hitler nor any other German leader ever responded to the "questionnaire".

Ambassador to France
In 1937, Phipps was transferred to Paris as British Ambassador to France.

During his time in Paris, Phipps strongly identified himself with French Foreign Minister Georges Bonnet, and most of his dispatches to London reflected Bonnet's influence. On 24 September 1938, at the height of the great crisis over Czechoslovakia that was to culminate in the Munich Agreement, Phipps reported back to London "all that is best in France is against war, almost at any price", but it was opposed by a "small, but noisy and corrupt, war group". Phipps's negative assessment of the willingness and ability of France to go to war with Germany in 1938 created doubts in London about the value of France as an ally.

In October 1938, Bonnet carried out a purge of the Quai d'Orsay, sidelining a number of officials opposed to his policy. In the aftermath of the purge, Bonnet was congratulated by Phipps for removing the "warmongers" René Massigli and Pierre Comert from the Quai d'Orsay, but he went on to complain that Bonnet should have sacked Secretary-General Alexis Saint-Legér Léger as well.  In response, Bonnet claimed that he and Saint-Legér Léger saw "eye to eye". Phipps, who knew about the state of relations between the two, drily noted that "in that case the eyes must be astigmatic".

In November 1939, suffering from ill-health, Phipps retired to Wiltshire. He died of a pulmonary embolism following a prostatectomy at the London Clinic in 1945.

Honours
Phipps was appointed Companion of the Order of St Michael and St George (CMG) in the 1920 New Year Honours, Commander of the Royal Victorian Order (CVO) in May 1922, Knight Commander of the Order of St Michael and St George (KCMG) in the 1927 Birthday Honours, Knight Grand Cross of the Order of St Michael and St George (GCMG) in 1934, Knight Grand Cross of the Royal Victorian Order (GCVO) in 1939, and Knight Grand Cross of the Order of the Bath (GCB) in 1941. He was appointed to the Privy Council in 1933, entitling him to the style "The Right Honourable". He also held the Grand Cross of the Legion d'Honneur and was a Commander of the Order of Leopold II of Belgium.

In 1943 he served as High Sheriff of Wiltshire.

Family
Phipps married Yvonne de Louvencourt in 1907. After her death in 1909 he married Frances Ward, daughter of the sculptor Herbert Ward, in 1911. He had six children, all by his second wife:
 Lieutenant-Colonel Mervyn Phipps (1912–1983)
 Lieutenant Alan Phipps RN (1915–1942; killed in action on Leros), whose son is Major-General Jeremy Phipps
 Mary Phipps (born 1923), married to Bonar Sykes, son of Sir Frederick Sykes and his wife, a daughter of former British Prime Minister Bonar Law
 Margaret Phipps (born 1925), married to George Cary, son of the Irish novelist Joyce Cary
 John-Francis Phipps (born 1933)
 William Phipps (1936–2009), who married Henrietta Frances Lamb (1931–2016), elder daughter of the painter Henry Lamb and his wife Lady Pansy Lamb (née Pakenham), sister of the 6th and 7th Earls of Longford

Ancestry

References

Sources
Adamthwaite, Anthony. France and the Coming of the Second World War 1936–1939. London: Frank Cass, 1977. .
Kidd, Charles, Williamson, David (editors). Debrett's Peerage and Baronetage (1990 edition). New York: St Martin's Press, 1990.
Herman, John. The Paris Embassy of Sir Eric Phipps, Sussex Academic Press, 1998.
Oxford Dictionary of National Biography.
Watt, D.C. How War Came : The Immediate Origins of the Second World War, 1938–1939. New York: Pantheon Books, 1989. .

External links

The Papers of Sir Eric Phipps held at Churchill Archives Centre

1875 births
1945 deaths
Alumni of King's College, Cambridge
University of Paris alumni
High Sheriffs of Wiltshire
Knights Grand Cross of the Order of the Bath
Knights Grand Cross of the Order of St Michael and St George
Knights Grand Cross of the Royal Victorian Order
Commanders of the Order of Leopold II
Grand Croix of the Légion d'honneur
Members of the Privy Council of the United Kingdom
Deaths from pulmonary embolism
Ambassadors of the United Kingdom to France
Ambassadors of the United Kingdom to Germany
Ambassadors of the United Kingdom to Austria
Eric